The West Coast Range is a mountain range located in the West Coast region of Tasmania, Australia.

The range lies to the west and north of the main parts of the Franklin-Gordon Wild Rivers National Park.

The range has had a significant number of  mines utilising the geologically rich zone of Mount Read Volcanics. A number of adjacent ranges lie to the east: the Engineer Range, the Raglan Range, the Eldon Range, and the Sticht Range but in most cases these are on a west–east alignment, while the West Coast Range runs in a north–south direction, following the Mount Read volcanic arc.

The range has encompassed multiple land uses including the catchment area for Hydro Tasmania dams, mines, transport routes and historical sites.  Of the communities that have existed actually in the range itself, Gormanston, is probably the last to remain.

Geographical features 
These are determined by a number of factors - the southerly direction of glaciation in the King River Valley and around the Tyndalls; as well as the general north -south orientation of the West Coast Range itself.

Mountains
The following mountains are contained within the West Coast Range, including sub-ranges without a specifically named peak and also including subsidiary peaks.

Smaller hills and features
 Darwin Crater - a probable meteorite impact crater associated with Darwin glass
 Gooseneck Hill
 Henty Glacial Moraine
 Marble Bluff - adjacent to the confluence of the Eldon and South Eldon rivers and the northern edge of Lake Burbury
 Teepookana Plateau
 Thureau Hills - adjacent to the eastern slopes of Mount Owen and Mount Huxley
 Walford Peak - adjacent to Lake Dora

Rivers
Anthony River on the northern part of the range
 Bird River at the southern end of the range
 Eldon River on the eastern side of the range
 Governor River on the eastern side of the range
Henty River on the western side of the range
King River starting in the Eldon Range  and passing between Mount Huxley and Mount Jukes, dammed by The Hydro
Mackintosh River
Murchison River
Pieman River
Queen River  runs through Queenstown, then to join with the King River to the west of Mount Huxley
 Sophia River
 South Eldon River
 Tofft River  runs between the Thureau hills and Mount Owen and Mount Huxley
 Yolande River between Lake Margaret and the Henty River

Lakes
 Basin Lake - on the western side of the range
 Lake Adam -  a tributary lake for Lake Margaret
 Lake Barnabas
 Lake Beatrice -  on the eastern edge of Mount Sedgwick
 Lake Burbury - created by the damming of the King River by The Hydro
 Lake Dora
 Lake Dorothy
 Lake Huntley - on the eastern side of Mount Tyndall
 Lake Julia -  in the area of the range known as 'The Tyndalls'
 Lake Mackintosh - created by damming the Mackintosh River
 Lake Magdala - a tributary lake for Lake Margaret
 Lake Martha - tributary lake for Lake Margaret
 Lake Mary, Tasmania - a tributary lake for Lake Margaret
 Lake Margaret  on the northern side of Mount Sedgwick
 Lake Monica - tributary lake for Lake Margaret
 Lake Murchison  - created by the damming of the Murchison River
 Lake Myra - tributary lake for Lake Margaret
 Lake Paul - tributary lake for Lake Margaret
 Lake Peter - tributary lake for Lake Margaret
 Lake Philip - a tributary lake for Lake Margaret
 Lake Plimsoll
 Lake Polycarp - a tributary lake for Lake Margaret
 Lake Rolleston - between the Tyndall Range and the Sticht Range
 Lake Selina  - just west of Lake Plimsoll
 Lake Spicer - just west of Eldon Peak
 Lake Tyndall - south of Mount Tyndall
 Lake Westwood - next to Mount Julia

Reserves
 Mount Farrell Regional Reserve
 Mount Murchison Regional Reserve
 Tyndall Regional Reserve
 Lake Beatrice Conservation Area
 Princess River Conservation Area
 Crotty Conservation Area
 West Coast Range Regional Reserve (Clark River Valley)

Vegetation
The slopes of Mount Owen,  Mount Lyell and Mount Sedgwick are covered in stumps of forest trees killed by fires and smelter fumes from the earlier part of the twentieth century.  The devastation of forests close to the mining operations at Queenstown was substantial as early as the 1890s and continued late into the twentieth century.

Some Huon Pine on the slopes of Mount Read have been found that show considerable age.

Due to fire, mining and a range of human activities the vegetation zones along the West Coast range can be considered to be mainly modified, and few pockets of vegetation could be considered unchanged since European presence.

The eastern side of the range is on the western boundary of the Franklin-Gordon Wild Rivers National Park, and at these points the forests are in better condition.

Forestry conservation zones exist along its length in accordance with the Regional Forestry Agreement (RFA).

Climate
In the average winter the "1,000 metre snowline" sees most of the mountains with snow. In previous decades, Lake Margaret was the main long-term weather-reporting location, however the Mount Read automatic weather station now maintains extremes regularly reported on the Bureau of Meteorology website for extreme conditions. The rainfall records of Lake Margaret were on a par with Tully in Queensland for the highest rainfall in Australia.  Approximations for the West Coast Range are made at 2800–3000 mm precipitation per year.

The prevailing weather is due to the location of the West Coast. It has no landmass shielding it from the Southern Ocean or Antarctic weather, and being in the Roaring Forties cold fronts and extreme weather are regular occurrences on the West Coast. The Cape Sorell Waverider Buoy which was initiated by the BOM in 1998 (there had been earlier testing buoys in the early 1990s) has given good indications of the behaviour of ocean swells to correlate with weather conditions.

Earlier weather records were kept for Queenstown and Zeehan.  Due to change in population distribution and resources in the west coast, the main weather data is currently from Strahan Airport and Mount Read.

The following BOM recorded locations are relevant to West Coast Range:

History and exploration 
Early European exploration of the range was made by explorers, and by convicts escaping from Macquarie Harbour Penal Station on Sarah Island. Most occurred in the late nineteenth century, but as late as the 1940s some government maps had "unexplored" or "insufficient survey" or words to that effect.

Of the mountains that are viewable from Macquarie Harbour - most were names associated with the proponents for and against the ideas that Charles Darwin was putting forward in the late 19th century.

Thomas Bather Moore named Darwin, Geikie and Read and the Tyndall Range. Charles Gould named 1860 between 1862 Murchison, Sedgwick, Lyell and Owen; Huxley and Jukes were named later.

There were very small mining settlements in the Tyndalls, on Mount Darwin and Mount Jukes, and possibly very small camps of short duration in other locations.  Linda in the Linda Valley is probably the only other remaining named location with population in a valley in the range.  Queenstown lies in the Queen River valley on the western slopes of Mount Owen, or south western slopes of Mount Lyell, and is in effect 'out' of the range.

Mining 

The Tasmanian Mines Department (in its various names over the last hundred years) has had guides to the minerals found in Tasmania - most are found in the West Coast region, these include 
Barium, Copper, Gold, Pyrites, Silver, Zinc.

Mining sites, in most cases short-lived exist on the upper regions of Mount Darwin, and Mount Jukes. Longer lasting mines existed on the middle slopes of Mount Lyell (North, West and South sides), and on the middle and upper slopes of Mount Read. 
Mineral exploration has occurred on the slopes of almost all of the named mountains over time.  
Conservation measures in recent decades have put special restrictions on the activity so as to not replicate the damage of the Mount Lyell operation.  A good example of the capacity to mine in a sensitive area is the Henty Gold Mine, at the northern end of the range.

Hydro dams 
The West Coast of Tasmania was always attractive to plans for dams for hydro electricity.  The King River was surveyed for this at the time of the First World War.

Then in the 1950s and early 1960s the early HEC surveys were conducted.  The upper part of the Pieman scheme dammed parts of the West Coast Range, and the final major projects of the HEC dam making project were the Henty and King River Schemes.

Pieman River Scheme
The Pieman River Power Scheme involved the  damming of rivers that start in the West Coast Range.  It was the scheme that followed the Gordon River Scheme - and was to be followed by the Franklin River Scheme - but in reality was followed by the King River and Henty River schemes instead.

Construction commenced in 1974 and the scheme was completed by 1987.  It involved dams on the Murchison and Macintosh rivers, as well as the Pieman River.  The main construction town and administrative centre for the Hydro was at Tullah.

The Mackintosh Dam and power station were north of Tullah, while the Murchsion Dam and Lake were south.  A third dam - the Bastyan Dam was just north of Rosebery, while the Reece Dam was a long way to the west - close to the town of Corinna.

King River Scheme
The Crotty Dam is an 82 metre high  Hydro Tasmania dam on the King River between Mount Huxley and Mount Jukes.  The Darwin Dam is a saddle dam at the foot of Mount Darwin.  Both of the dams contain the 54 square kilometre Lake Burbury water storage area.

Transport 
Initial access to the west coast region was by foot or by access from the sea - railways progressed further into the region much earlier than roads - the road from Hobart was not connected until the 1930s and the north coast until the 1960s.

Railways

To support the Mount Lyell and North Mount Lyell mines, railways were built from ports on Macquarie Harbour and travelled to the edge of the Range.  They did not traverse the range.

North Mount Lyell Railway - port was at Pillinger in Kelly Basin
Mount Lyell Railway - port was at Regatta Point

Similarly the lines that connected with the Emu Bay Railway - the North East Dundas Tramway for example, did not traverse the range, but travelled to the foot of the mountains where the mines were active.

Roads
The Lyell Highway connection running through the West Coast range at the Linda Valley was not constructed until the 1930s.

The road to Crotty from Queenstown (or more correctly the locality of Lynchford), built as the Mount Jukes Road by the Hydro as part of the King River dam scheme in the 1980s passed high above the King River Gorge on the northern side of Mount Jukes.

The Anthony Road constructed by the Hydro during the construction of the Anthony Power Scheme also cuts through the northern part of the range, as well as access to the glacial lakes in The Tyndalls - Lake Westwood, Lake Selina and Lake Julia.

Landing grounds
Although not currently serviced as a registered aerodrome the Queenstown airport (in operation in the 1960s and 1970s) just west of the townsite is the closest air service facility. Strahan Airport is the closest registered airport.

There have been a significant number of temporary helicopter landing sites throughout the range used by Hydro Tasmania and mineral exploration activities - but no inventory is known of these locations.

Historical features and recent sites

Tramways and railways
Comstock Tram around the slopes of Mount Lyell - not to be confused with a tramway with same name out of Zeehan.
Lake Margaret Tram at western side of Mount Sedgwick
North Mount Lyell Railway Linda Valley, along King River Valley, through the Crotty and Darwin townsites to Pillinger and Kelly Basin.

Townsites
Crotty on the eastern slopes of Mount Jukes
Darwin on the eastern slopes of Mount Darwin
Gormanston on the northern slopes of Mount Owen
Lake Margaret precinct
Linda in the Linda Valley between Mounts Owen and Lyell
Tullah amidst Lake Rosebery
Rosebery
Williamsford

Mine sites
Henty Gold Mine
Mount Jukes Mine sites on the upper slopes -including  'Lake Jukes Mine'

Hydro sites
Anthony Power Station
Bastyan Power Station
Crotty Dam
Darwin Dam
John Butters Power Station
Lake Margaret Power Station
Franklin River proposed power development - cancelled in the 1980s
Gordon River proposed power development - cancelled in the 1980s

Main roads
Lyell Highway [A10] in the Linda Valley between Mounts Owen and Lyell
 The Henty River Rd [B24] From Henty Glacial Moraine to  the Lake Murchison Dam (Anthony Power Station) and Tullah

Walking tracks
Numerous historic walking tracks were started in the nineteenth and twentieth century; some survive, some are overgrown. The most famous of the track makers was Thomas Bather Moore.  He named many features including Mount Strahan, the Thureau Hills and the Tofft River.

Geological mapping
A major mapping of the region of the range was conducted between 1986 and 1993

 Map 1. Geology of the Mt. Charter-Hellyer area.
 Map 2. Geology of Rosebery-Mt. Black area.
 Map 3. Geology of the Henty River-Mt. Read area
 Map 4. Geology of the Mt. Murchison area
 Map 5. Geology of the Tyndall Range area
 Map 6. Geological compilation map of the Mount Read volcanics & associated rocks, Hellyer to south Darwin Peak
 Map 7. Geology of the Back Peak-Cradle Mountain Link Road area (not West Coast Range area)
 Map 8. Geology of the Mt. Cattley-Mt. Tor area (not West Coast Range area)
 Map 9. Geology of the Winterbrook-Moina area (not West Coast Range area)
 Map 10. Geology of the Elliott Bay-Mt. Osmund area (not West Coast Range area)
 Map 11. Geology of the Wanderer River-Moores Valley area (not West Coast Range area)
 Map 12. Geology of the D'Aguilar Range area (not West Coast Range area)
 Map 13. Geology of the Mt. Jukes-Mt. Darwin area.

See also

 List of highest mountains of Tasmania

References

Further reading

External links 
 West Coast Range on Google Maps
 https://www.webcitation.org/query?url=http://www.geocities.com/tazydevilbear/westcoastmtns/westcoastmtns.html&date=2009-10-25+22:39:36 - for a sample of photos of parts of the range
 http://www.parks.tas.gov.au/wha/wherein/detail.html - context of World Heritage Area
 Hydro Tasmania

Mountain ranges of Tasmania
History of Tasmania
 
Huon Pine
King River power development scheme